In eight-dimensional geometry, a heptellated 8-simplex is a convex uniform 8-polytope, including 7th-order truncations (heptellation) from the regular 8-simplex.

There are 35 unique heptellations for the 8-simplex, including all permutations of truncations, cantellations, runcinations, sterications, pentellations, and hexications. The simplest heptellated 8-simplex is also called an expanded 8-simplex, with only the first and last nodes ringed, is constructed by an expansion operation applied to the regular 8-simplex. The highest form, the heptihexipentisteriruncicantitruncated 8-simplex is more simply called a omnitruncated 8-simplex with all of the nodes ringed.

Heptellated 8-simplex

Alternate names 
 Expanded 8-simplex
  Small exated enneazetton (soxeb) (Jonathan Bowers)

Coordinates 
The vertices of the heptellated 8-simplex can bepositioned in 8-space as permutations of (0,1,1,1,1,1,1,1,2). This construction is based on facets of the heptellated 9-orthoplex.

A second construction in 9-space, from the center of a rectified 9-orthoplex is given by coordinate permutations of:
 (1,-1,0,0,0,0,0,0,0)

Root vectors 
Its 72 vertices represent the root vectors of the simple Lie group A8.

Images

Omnitruncated 8-simplex

The symmetry order of an omnitruncated 8-simplex is 725760. The symmetry of a family of a uniform polytopes is equal to the number of vertices of the omnitruncation, being 362880 (9 factorial) in the case of the omnitruncated 8-simplex; but when the CD symbol is palindromic, the symmetry order is doubled, 725760 here, because the element corresponding to any element of the underlying 8-simplex can be exchanged with one of those corresponding to an element of its dual.

Alternate names 
 Heptihexipentisteriruncicantitruncated 8-simplex
 Great exated enneazetton (goxeb) (Jonathan Bowers)

Coordinates 
The Cartesian coordinates of the vertices of the omnitruncated 8-simplex can be most simply positioned in 9-space as permutations of (0,1,2,3,4,5,6,7,8). This construction is based on facets of the heptihexipentisteriruncicantitruncated 9-orthoplex, t0,1,2,3,4,5,6,7{37,4}

Images

Permutohedron and related tessellation 

The omnitruncated 8-simplex is the permutohedron of order 9. The omnitruncated 8-simplex is a zonotope, the Minkowski sum of nine line segments parallel to the nine lines through the origin and the nine vertices of the 8-simplex.

Like all uniform omnitruncated n-simplices, the omnitruncated 8-simplex can tessellate space by itself, in this case 8-dimensional space with three facets around each ridge.

Related polytopes 

This polytope is one of 135 uniform 8-polytopes with A8 symmetry.

Notes

References 
 H.S.M. Coxeter: 
 H.S.M. Coxeter, Regular Polytopes, 3rd Edition, Dover New York, 1973 
 Kaleidoscopes: Selected Writings of H.S.M. Coxeter, edited by F. Arthur Sherk, Peter McMullen, Anthony C. Thompson, Asia Ivic Weiss, Wiley-Interscience Publication, 1995,  
 (Paper 22) H.S.M. Coxeter, Regular and Semi Regular Polytopes I, [Math. Zeit. 46 (1940) 380-407, MR 2,10]
 (Paper 23) H.S.M. Coxeter, Regular and Semi-Regular Polytopes II, [Math. Zeit. 188 (1985) 559-591]
 (Paper 24) H.S.M. Coxeter, Regular and Semi-Regular Polytopes III, [Math. Zeit. 200 (1988) 3-45]
 Norman Johnson Uniform Polytopes, Manuscript (1991)
 N.W. Johnson: The Theory of Uniform Polytopes and Honeycombs, Ph.D. 
  x3o3o3o3o3o3o3x - soxeb, x3x3x3x3x3x3x3x - goxeb

External links 
 Polytopes of Various Dimensions
 Multi-dimensional Glossary

8-polytopes